The Jeanneau Yachts 57 also called the Jeanneau 57, is a French blue water cruising sailboat with a hull designed by Philippe Briand, styling and interior by Vittorio Garroni and the Jeanneau Design Office. It was first built in 2009.

Production
The design was built by Jeanneau in France, from 2009 to 2015, but it is now out of production.

Design
The Jeanneau Yachts 57 is a recreational keelboat, built predominantly of polyester fiberglass, with wood trim. The hull is made from solid fiberglass and the deck from a fiberglass-balsa sandwich. It has a fractional sloop rig, with a keel-stepped mast, three sets of swept spreaders and aluminum spars with discontinuous Dyform rigging. The hull has a nearly-plumb stem, a reverse transom with steps and a swimming platform, an internally mounted spade-type rudder controlled by dual wheels and a fixed fin keel with a weighted bulb or optional deep-draft keel. The fin keel model displaces  empty and carries  of cast iron ballast, while the deep draft version displaces  empty and carries  of cast iron ballast.

The boat is fitted with a German VW Marine TDI 140-5  fuel-injected diesel engine or a Swedish Volvo D3-150 CV  diesel engine for docking and maneuvering.

The design has several different interior arrangements, with sleeping accommodation for five to nine people. A typical three-cabin configuration has a double berth forward, plus a single berth in the very bow, a "U"-shaped settee and a straight settee in the main cabin and an aft cabin with a double berth. The galley is located on the port side just forward of the companionway ladder. The galley is "J"-shaped and is equipped with a stove, an refrigerator and a double sink. A navigation station is opposite the galley, on the starboard side. This three cabin configuration includes three heads, one for each cabin, but up to four heads may be fitted.

Operational history
In a 2010 review for Cruising World, Bill Springer wrote, "I think Jeanneau is on to something with its new line of yachts. The 53 is spacious, stylish, and sails well. The 57 has even more elbowroom, more sophisticated systems, larger battery capacity, and the dinghy “garage,” but both boats are designed to do the same thing: provide all the luxury of a big boat without the relatively big big-boat price tag."

See also
List of sailing boat types

References

External links

Keelboats
2000s sailboat type designs
Sailing yachts
Sailboat type designs by Philippe Briand
Sailboat type designs by Vittorio Garroni
Sailboat type designs by Jeanneau Design Office
Sailboat types built by Jeanneau